Kosmos u tvom srcu / Igračke se voze levom rukom (Cosmos in Your Heart / Toys are Driven with the Left Hand) is the second compilation album by the Serbian indie/alternative rock band Obojeni Program released by the Serbian netlabel Exit Music for free digital download as well as the Dutch independent record label Hello Bing in 2009. The material released on the two releases consists of rerecorded versions of the previously released material. All the tracks had their titles changed on this release and some tracks are different versions on LP and digital audio. Single was released on vinyl as well (Ja hocu te / 982), track "Ja Hocu Te" is cover song (Boye) and "982" is new version of song "981", both tracks in this version exist only on this single. LP "Kosmos U Tvom Srcu" and Single "Ja Hocu Te / 982" were released in physical format on vinyl only, this was recorded all in the same session.

Track listing 
All lyrics and music by Obojeni Program.

Kosmos u tvom srcu

Igračke se voze levom rukom

Personnel 
The band
 Branislav Babić "Kebra" — vocals
 Ljubomir Pejić "Ljuba" — bass guitar, backing vocals
 Vladimir Cinkocki "Cina" — drums, backing vocals
 Dragan Knežević — guitar, backing vocals
 Miloš Romić — DJ

Additional personnel
 ShpiRa — effects, additional electronics
 Mile Ćirić — recorded by
 Boris Mladenović — producer
 Zlaya Hadzich — mastered by

References 

 Kosmos u tvom srcu / Igračke se voze levom rukom at Discogs
 EX YU ROCK enciklopedija 1960-2006, Janjatović Petar; 
 NS rockopedija, novosadska rock scena 1963-2003, Mijatović Bogomir, SWITCH, 2005

Obojeni Program albums
2009 compilation albums